Miss USA 2001 was the 50th Miss USA pageant, held at the Genesis Convention Center in Gary, Indiana on March 2, 2001. The event was won by Kandace Krueger of Texas, who was crowned by outgoing queen Lynnette Cole of Tennessee.

The pageant was held in Gary for the first time, at the Genesis Convention Center, and was held in early March for the first time in two years, after being held in Branson, Missouri from 1999 to 2000 in early February. This became only the second time in seven years that a Miss Teen USA state delegate did not win or inherit the Miss USA title.

William Shatner hosted the event for the only time, and color commentary was provided by Tommy Davidson, Vanessa Minnillo, Miss Teen USA 1998 and Lara Dutta, the reigning Miss Universe.  Entertainment was provided by  Lara Fabian, Evan and Jaron and The Warren Brothers.

Results

Placements

Special awards

Final competition scores

 Winner
 First Runner-Up
 Second Runner-Up
 Finalists

Delegates

The Miss USA 2001 delegates were:

 Alabama – Laura Hoffman
 Alaska – Ivette Fernandez
 Arizona – Tasha Dixon
 Arkansas – Jessie Davis
 California – Jennifer Glover
 Colorado – Katee Doland
 Connecticut – Amy Vanderoef
 Delaware – Stacey Smith
 District of Columbia – Liane Angus
 Florida – Julie Donaldson
 Georgia – Tiffany Fallon
 Hawaii – Christy Leonard
 Idaho – Elizabeth Barchas
 Illinois – Rebecca Ambrosi
 Indiana – Sarah McClary
 Iowa – Clarissa Kroese
 Kansas – Kristie Knox
 Kentucky – Jo Pritchard
 Louisiana – Heather Hayden
 Maine – Melissa Bard
 Maryland – Megan Gunning
 Massachusetts – Dana Powell
 Michigan – Kenya Howard
 Minnesota – Anne Clausen
 Mississippi – Melanie Vaughn
 Missouri – Larissa Meek
 Montana – CaCe Hardy
 Nebraska – Sujoing Drakeford
 Nevada – Gina Giacinto
 New Hampshire – Melissa Robbins
 New Jersey – Jeanette Josue
 New Mexico – Jennifer Adams
 New York – Lisa Pavlakis
 North Carolina – Monica Palumbo
 North Dakota – Michelle Guthmiller
 Ohio – Amanda Canary
 Oklahoma – Cortney Phillips
 Oregon – Endia Li Abrante
 Pennsylvania – Jennifer Watkins
 Rhode Island – Yanaiza Alvarez
 South Carolina – Candace Richards
 South Dakota – Beth Lovro
 Tennessee – Lisa Tollett
 Texas – Kandace Krueger
 Utah – Tiffany Seaman
 Vermont – Katy Johnson
 Virginia – Kristel Jenkins
 Washington – Bre Sakas
 West Virginia – Karen Long
 Wisconsin – Kari Jo Dodge
 Wyoming – Heather Jackelen

Historical significance 
 Texas wins competition for the eighth time. 
 District of Columbia earns the 1st runner-up position for the second time. The last time it placed this was in 1963. Also  reaches its highest placement since 1984.
 Georgia earns the 2nd runner-up position for the third time. The last time it placed this was in 1988. Also had its highest placement since 1993.
 Missouri finishes as Top 5 for the first time. Also had its highest placement since 1998. 
 Nevada finishes as Top 5 for the first time. Also had its highest placement since 1977.
 States that placed in semifinals the previous year were Georgia, Michigan and Tennessee.
 Michigan placed for the fourth consecutive year. 
 Tennessee placed for the third consecutive year. 
 Georgia made its second consecutive placement. 
 Oklahoma last placed in 1999.
 Missouri and Texas last placed in 1998.
 Rhode Island last placed in 1997.
 District of Columbia last placed in 1990.
 Oregon last placed in 1991.
 Nevada last placed in 1987.
 New York and South Carolina break an ongoing streak of placements since 1999.

Crossovers

Seven delegates had previously competed in either the Miss Teen USA or Miss America pageants and four delegates would later win a Miss America state title. Two of those who competed at Miss USA 2001, Katee Doland and Elizabeth Barchas, later became Triple Crown winners, for holding state titles for Miss Teen USA, Miss USA and Miss America

Delegates who had previously held a Miss Teen USA state title were:
Sarah McClary (Indiana) - Miss Indiana Teen USA 1995
Kristel Jenkins (Virginia) - Miss Virginia Teen USA 1995
Larissa Meek (Missouri) - Miss Missouri Teen USA 1997
Elizabeth Barchas (Idaho) - Miss Idaho Teen USA 1998

Delegates who had previously held a Miss America state title or would later win one were:

Gina Giacinto (Nevada) - Miss Nevada 1999 (Preliminary Swimsuit award)
Katy Johnson (Vermont) - Miss Vermont 1999
Jennifer Glover (California) - Miss California 2002
Elizabeth Barchas (Idaho) - Miss Idaho 2004 (Non-finalist Interview award)
Heather Jackelen (Wyoming) - Miss Wyoming 2005

Judges

Daniel Baldwin
Karen Duffy
Ernie Hudson
Ananda Lewis
Doris Roberts
Martha Stewart
Drew Pinsky

See also
Miss Universe 2001

References

External links

Miss USA official website 

2001
2001 beauty pageants
March 2001 events in the United States
2001 in Indiana